Nisa Aşgabat is a Turkmen football club based in Aşgabat. They relegated from the top division in Turkmen football in 2006 and currently play in the second division, the Birinji liga. Their home stadium is Nisa-Çandybil Stadium which can hold 1,500 people.

Honours
Ýokary Liga
Champions (4): 1996, 1998–99, 2001, 2003

Turkmenistan Cup
Winners: 1998
Runners-up: 1996, 2000, 2003

Performance in AFC competitions
 AFC Champions League: 2 appearances
2002–03: Group stage
 Asian Club Championship: 2 appearances
1998: Second Round
2001: First Round
AFC Cup: 2 appearances
2004: Group stage
2005: Group stage
AFC Cup Winners Cup: 2 appearances
1998–99: Second Round
2001–02: First Round

Football clubs in Turkmenistan
Football clubs in Ashgabat
1994 establishments in Turkmenistan